Aleksandar Veselinov Vasilev (Bulgarian: Александър Веселинов Василев; born 27 April 1995) is a Bulgarian professional footballer who plays as a left back/winger for Cherno More Varna.

Club career

Early career
Aleksandar Vasilev started his career playing for his hometown club Levski Strazhitsa. He moved eventually to Vidima-Rakovski, before being invited to join Hristo Stoichkov's academy at Chavdar Etropole. In 2012, he made his professional football debut for Chavdar in the B Group, providing the winning goal for the team in a 1-0 win against Akademik Sofia. In the following season he made 22 appearances for the club, most of them as a substitute. In the summer of 2013 he moved to fellow B Group side Kaliakra Kavarna, where he established himself as a main squad player for the club in the 2013–14 B Group.

Ludogorets Razgrad
On 6 June 2014 he signed for Ludogorets together with his Bulgaria U19 teammate, Preslav Petrov. On 2 August 2014 Vasilev made his official debut for Ludogorets in an A Group match against Marek Dupnitsa. A year later, on 21 August 2015, he scored his first goal for the team in a 3-0 win against Pirin Blagoevgrad.

Loan to Beroe
On 14 June 2016 Vasilev signed for Beroe Stara Zagora on a season long loan deal. He made his debut on 7 August 2016 in a league match against Slavia Sofia, debuting with a goal in a 2-1 win for Beroe. His good performances led him being called-up back by Ludogorets's main squad on 6 January 2017.

Return to Ludogorets
Vasilev returned in play for Ludogorets II on 13 March 2017 in a match against Tsarsko Selo Sofia. On 18 March 2017 he played his first match for the season for Ludogorets in a 2:2 draw against Dunav Ruse. For the Bulgarian Cup match on 18 April 2017 against Litex Lovech, Vasilev played the full match and scored one goal for the 4:0 win.

Beroe
On 1 June 2018, Vasilev signed with Beroe.

International career

Senior level
On 14 March 2017 Vasilev received his first call up for Bulgaria main squad for the match against Netherlands on 25 March 2017. He completed the match on the bench staying as unused substitute for the 2:0 win over Netherlands.

Club statistics

Honours
Ludogorets
First League (4): 2014–15, 2015–16, 2016–17, 2017–18
Bulgarian Supercup: 2014

References

External links

1995 births
Living people
People from Strazhitsa
Bulgarian footballers
Bulgaria youth international footballers
Bulgaria under-21 international footballers
Bulgaria international footballers
First Professional Football League (Bulgaria) players
Second Professional Football League (Bulgaria) players
FC Chavdar Etropole players
PFC Kaliakra Kavarna players
PFC Ludogorets Razgrad II players
PFC Ludogorets Razgrad players
PFC Beroe Stara Zagora players
Association football wingers
Association football fullbacks
Sportspeople from Veliko Tarnovo Province